Edward Du Bois may refer to:

Eduard Dubois (1619–1696), Flemish-born painter active in Holland, Italy and England
Edward Dubois (wit) (1774–1850), English wit and man of letters
Edward C. Dubois, from the List of justices of the Rhode Island Supreme Court
W. E. B. Du Bois (1868–1963), American sociologist, historian, and civil rights activist.
Ed Dubois (1952–2016), English yacht designer